The rock vole (Microtus chrotorrhinus) is a medium-sized vole found in eastern North America. It is also called the yellow-nosed vole.

Description
This species is similar in appearance to the larger taiga vole. It has short ears and a long tail which is paler underneath. The fur is greyish-brown with grey underparts and a yellowish nose.

Habitat and distribution
They are found on moist rocky slopes in eastern Canada and the northeastern United States. They make runways through the surface growth and shallow burrows. They are usually found in small colonies.

Ecology
They feed on grasses, mosses, underground fungi and berries (especially bunchberry), and also sometimes on caterpillars. Predators include hawks, owls, snakes and small carnivorous mammals.

Breeding
The female vole has two or three litters of four to seven young.   They are active year-round, mainly during the day, but are rarely seen. It has been designated as a species of concern in some parts of its range.

References

Vole, Rock
Mammals of Canada
Microtus
Mammals described in 1894